Shoushan or Shou Mountain is a mountain located in Xingcheng, Liaoning, China.

Cultural significance

Ancient beacon tower
There is an ancient beacon tower which was built during the Ming Dynasty on the middle of Mount Shou. Its diameter is 13 meters, and the height is 7 meters. Although this building suffered hundreds of years of weathering by wind and rain, it still stands on the top of the mountain.

Mountains of Liaoning
Huludao